Pacini may refer to the following persons:
 Piero Pacini da Pescia (flourished 1495-1514), Italian publisher
 Giovanni Pacini, a 19th-century Italian composer, known mostly for his operas
 Sante Pacini (1735 - circa 1790), Italian painter and engraver active mostly in Tuscany in an early Neoclassic style

 Alfredo Pacini, an Italian prelate of the Roman Catholic Church
 Domenico Pacini, an Italian physicist
 Edoardo Pacini, an Italian footballer
 Émilien Pacini, a 19th-century French librettist of Italian origin
 Filippo Pacini, an Italian anatomist
 Francesco Pacini (born 1906, date of death unknown), Italian modern pentathlete
 Francesco Pacini (footballer)
 Franco Pacini, an Italian astrophysicist
 Giuseppe Pacini, an Italian footballer
 José Pacini, an Argentine football player
 Mark Pacini, an American video game designer
 Piero Pacini da Pescia, an Italian publisher
 Regina Pacini, a Portuguese lyric soprano
 Roberto Pacini, an Italian director, author and theatre and film producer
 Sophie Pacini (born 1991), German-Italian pianist

It may also refer to:
 Pacinian corpuscle, mechanoreceptor responsible for sensitivity to deep pressure touch and high frequency vibration

Italian-language surnames
Jewish surnames